Events from the year 1811 in Ireland.

Events
Kildare Place Society (formally, The Society for Promoting the Education of the Poor in Ireland) founded as a non-denominational organisation by a group of Dublin philanthropists.
The Missionary: An Indian Tale, a romance novela by Irish author Sydney Owenson (Lady Morgan) is published.
4 December – Royal Navy frigate  is driven in a gale onto rocks in Lough Swilly with no survivors from the estimated 253 aboard.

Arts and literature
James Sheridan Knowles' play Brian Boroihme; or, The Maid of Erin is performed in Belfast.

Births
21 January – James Hamilton, 1st Duke of Abercorn, politician and twice Lord Lieutenant of Ireland (died 1885).
10 March – Yankee Sullivan, bare knuckle fighter and boxer (died 1856).
11 March – Lady Katherine Sophia Kane née Baily, botanist (died 1886).
11 November – John Egan, businessman and politician in Ottawa (died 1857).
Full date unknown
Patrick Murray, theologian (died 1882).

Deaths
Robert Brooke, soldier, Governor of St Helena (born 1744).

References

 
Years of the 19th century in Ireland
1810s in Ireland
Ireland
 Ireland